Stone School may refer to:

Stone School (LeClaire, Iowa), listed on the National Register of Historic Places in Scott County, Iowa
Stone School (Ann Arbor, Michigan), listed on the National Register of Historic Places in Washtenaw County, Michigan
Stone School (Newmarket, New Hampshire), listed on the National Register of Historic Places in Rockingham County, New Hampshire